Jacopo Marin (born 24 March 1984 in Grado) is a former male sprinter from Italy who specialized in the 400 metres.

Biography
His personal best time is 46.99 seconds, achieved in Velenje (Slovenia). He won a gold medal in the 4 x 400 metres relay at the 2009 European Indoor Championships, together with teammates Matteo Galvan, Domenico Rao and Claudio Licciardello.

Achievements

References

External links
 

1984 births
Living people
Italian male sprinters
Athletics competitors of Centro Sportivo Carabinieri
People from the Province of Gorizia
Sportspeople from Friuli-Venezia Giulia